Bapchule (O'odham language: Pi:pchul) is an unincorporated community in northern Pinal County, Arizona, United States. It lies in the Gila River Indian Community, south of the Phoenix Metropolitan Area. Although Bapchule is unincorporated, it has a post office (P.O. Boxes only) with the ZIP code of 85121.

History
Bapchule's population was estimated as 100 in the 1960 census.

Bapchule is the location of the death of Ira Hayes, renowned for his exploits during the invasion of Iwo Jima in World War II. He was one of the Marines in the famous picture Raising the American Flag on Mount Suribachi.

Climate
This area has a large amount of sunshine year round due to its stable descending air and high pressure.  According to the Köppen Climate Classification system, Bapchule has a desert climate, abbreviated "BWh" on climate maps.

References

Unincorporated communities in Pinal County, Arizona
Unincorporated communities in Arizona
Gila River Indian Community